Nick Kyrgios was the defending champion, but chose to compete in Beijing instead.

David Goffin won the title, defeating Adrian Mannarino in the final, 6–3, 7–5.

Seeds

Draw

Finals

Top half

Bottom half

Qualifying

Seeds

Qualifiers

Qualifying draw

First qualifier

Second qualifier

Third qualifier

Fourth qualifier

External links
Main draw
Qualifying draw

Rakuten Japan Open Tennis Championships Singles